Microdon cothurnatus  (Bigot 1884), the orange-legged ant fly, is a species of syrphid fly observed across the Northern United States and Canada. Hoverflies can remain nearly motionless in flight. The  adults are also  known as flower flies for they are commonly found on flowers except Microdon species are seldom observed around flowers. Larvae have been found in several species of ant.

References

Diptera of North America
Hoverflies of North America
Microdontinae
Insects described in 1884
Taxa named by Jacques-Marie-Frangile Bigot